Azreh-ye Mohammad Khan (also Romanized as Azreh-ye Moḩammad Khān) is a village in Sanjabi Rural District, Kuzaran District, Kermanshah County, Kermanshah Province, Iran. At the 2006 census, its population was 48, in 9 families.

References 

Populated places in Kermanshah County